Mariano Hoyas de la Cruz (born 19 September 1970 in Plasencia, Extremadura) is a Spanish retired footballer who played as a right back.

References

External links

Celta de Vigo biography 

1970 births
Living people
People from Plasencia
Sportspeople from the Province of Cáceres
Spanish twins
Twin sportspeople
Spanish footballers
Footballers from Extremadura
Association football defenders
La Liga players
Segunda División players
Segunda División B players
Tercera División players
Deportivo Fabril players
Deportivo de La Coruña players
RC Celta de Vigo players
CP Mérida footballers
Recreativo de Huelva players
FC Cartagena footballers
Spain under-23 international footballers